Nemapogon ruricolella, the gold-sheen clothes moth, is a moth of the family Tineidae. It is found in Great Britain, Spain, France, the Netherlands, Germany, Austria, Switzerland, Italy, the Czech Republic, Albania, Bulgaria, Romania, Moldova, Greece, Ukraine and Russia, as well as on Sardinia. The habitat consists of woodlands, heathlands and commons.

The wingspan is 10–14 mm. It is very similar to Nemapogon cloacella but has  paler brown forewing markings. Adults are on wing from late May to early August in one generation per year.

The larvae feed on bracket fungi, including Coriolus species, and dead wood.

References

External links
Lepiforum de
Images representing Nemapogon ruricolella  at  Consortium for the Barcode of Life

Moths described in 1859
Nemapogoninae